SS John A. McGean was a steamship that operated on the Great Lakes in the early 1900s until she sank in the Great Lakes Storm of 1913.

John A. McGean was built in 1908 by the American Shipbuilding Company at their shipyard in Lorain, Ohio.

On November 7 or 9, 1913, John A. McGean was sailing into the Great Storm when she was sighted for the final time off Tawas Point Light.  Sometime the following day, she sank with all 23 crew.  Her wreckage was not found until 1985, when it was discovered near Port Hope, Michigan with damage indicating that she had been swamped by a large wave. Portions of the wreckage were found by a local doctor along the shoreline at Bayfield, Ontario in mid-November 1913.

The body of chief engineer Calvin Smith was found near Black's Point, Ontario (just south of Goderich, Ontario) in late November 1913. Second cook D.M. Betts' remains were identified at the morgue in Goderich, Ontario via a photograph and details furnished by the Lake Carriers' Association. His remains were sent home to Girard, Pennsylvania on November 20, 1913.

References

Maritime incidents in 1913
Shipwrecks of Lake Huron
Ships lost with all hands
1908 ships
Ships built in Lorain, Ohio
Great Lakes freighters